The Christmas Oratorio is a 1983 novel by Swedish author Göran Tunström. It won the Nordic Council Literature Prize in 1984. J. S. Bach's Christmas Oratorio plays an important part in the novel.

It was adapted into  in 1996.

References

1983 Swedish novels
Christmas novels
Swedish-language novels
Nordic Council's Literature Prize-winning works
Novels set in Värmland
Novels set in New Zealand